Nyaay: The Justice is an 2021 Indian Hindi-language biographical drama film. The film is directed by Dilip Gulati and produced by Saraogi and Rahul Sharma. The film features Zuber Khan and Shreya Shukla in the lead roles. The film is being made under the banner of Vikas Productions.

Cast 
 Zuber K. Khan as Mahendra Singh (based on Sushant Singh Rajput)
 Shreya Shukla as Urvashi, Mahendra's girlfriend (based on Rhea Chakraborty)
 Aman Verma as ED Chief
 Asrani as K.K. Singh, Mahendra's father
 Shakti Kapoor as NCB Chief
 Sudha Chandran as CBI Chief
 Arun Bakshi
 Kiran Kumar as Mahinder's family lawyer
 Milind Gunaji as female Lead's lawyer
 Anwar Fatehan as Commissioner of Bihar Police
 Anant Jog as Commissioner of Mumbai Police
 Roshan Kumar as sub inspector of Mumbai police.

Plot 
The film revolves around a boy called Mahinder Singh who comes to tinsel town with the youthful innocence and exuberance associated with small towns. His sheer perseverance, dexterity and histrionics makes him earn the admiration of both critics and fans. His intellect, the choice of scripts not only makes him lock horns with the high and mighty but also a thorn in their flesh.

The film follows his story in the film industry.

Production 
Nyaay: The Justice, which is inspired by the life of late actor Sushant Singh Rajput, wrapped up its final schedule in October 2020. It was released on 11 June 2021, after initially being projected to release in April 2021.

References 

2021 films
2020s Hindi-language films
Indian films based on actual events
Drama films based on actual events
2021 biographical drama films
Indian biographical drama films